Great Controversy is a studio album by reggae artist Luciano.

Album information
Format: Compact Disc (64903510112)
Catalog #: 1011

Track listing
 Road Block
 Call On Yahweh
 Great Controversy
 Legalise It
 Are You Ready?
 Empress Love
 Why?
 Patiently
 Have Faith
 Rivers Of Babylon
 Free The World
 Bandits
 Good Papa
 Amen

References

2001 albums
Luciano (singer) albums